Bjørn Spiro (20 March 1909 – 1 June 1999) was a Danish film actor. He appeared in 60 films between 1914 and 1972.

Filmography

 Det hemmelighedsfulde X (1914)
 5 raske piger (1933)
 Der var engang en Vicevært (1937)
 Skilsmissens børn (1939)
 Damen med de lyse Handsker (1942)
 Kriminalassistent Bloch (1943)
 De røde enge (1945)
 Op med lille Martha (1946)
 Lyn-fotografen (1950)
 Mød mig paa Cassiopeia (1951)
 Kongeligt besøg (1954)
 Jan går til filmen (1954)
 Escape from Terror (1955)
 Mod og mandshjerte (1955)
 Far til fire i byen (1956)
 Natlogi betalt (1957)
 Laan mig din kone (1957)
 Skovridergaarden (1957)
 Pigen og vandpytten (1958)
 Poeten og Lillemor (1959)
 Helle for Helene (1959)
 Vi er allesammen tossede (1959)
 Telefonen ringer (1960)
 Tro, håb og trolddom (1960)
 Skibet er ladet med (1960)
 Forelsket i København (1960)
 Mine tossede drenge (1961)
 Stöten (1961)
 Cirkus Buster (1961)
 Gøngehøvdingen (1961)
 Svinedrengen og prinsessen på ærten (1962)
 Pigen og pressefotografen (1963)
 Dronningens vagtmester (1963)
 Måske i morgen (1964)
 Majorens oppasser (1964)
 Når enden er go' (1964)
 Tine (1964)
 Sommer i Tyrol (1964)
 Don Olsen kommer til byen (1964)
 En ven i bolignøden (1965)
 Flådens friske fyre (1965)
 Slå først, Frede! (1965)
 Gys og gæve tanter (1966)
 Nu stiger den (1966)
 Slap af, Frede! (1966)
 Pigen og greven (1966)
 Jeg er sgu min egen (1967)
 Min kones ferie (1967)
 Onkel Joakims hemmelighed (1967)
 Mig og min lillebror (1967)
 Uden en trævl (1968)
 Mig og min lillebror og storsmuglerne (1968)
 Olsen-banden (1968)
 Præriens skrappe drenge (1970)
 Svend, Knud og Valdemar (1970)
 Dimensionspigen (1970)
 Slå først Jensen (1971)
 Sejle op ad åen (1972)
 Olsen-bandens store kup (1972)

External links

1909 births
1999 deaths
Danish male film actors
People from Frederiksberg
20th-century Danish male actors